Mike Johnson is an American stop motion animator who has worked on films such as James and the Giant Peach and The Nightmare Before Christmas, short films such as an animation of "The Devil Went Down to Georgia" (used by Primus and Rednex for promotional videos for their covers of the song), and TV programmes such as The PJs. He is best known for directing Corpse Bride with Tim Burton; they were jointly nominated for the 2005 Academy Award for Best Animated Feature. He directed Ping Pong Rabbit, from a script by Peter Barsocchini. The film was released by Mili Pictures Worldwide in 2017 in Turkey and 2019 in the United States. Johnson was also attached to direct Oz Wars, a CGI/Stop-motion hybrid film.

In 1996, he set up his own animation company, Fat Cactus Films. He currently teaches stop-motion at the California Institute of the Arts and University of California Los Angeles.

References

External links
 
 Podcast interview with Mike Johnson
 Interview with Mike Johnson

American animated film directors
American animators
American film directors
Living people
Place of birth missing (living people)
Stop motion animators
Year of birth missing (living people)